Midana Quintino Sambú (born 10 June 1998) is a Bissau-Guinean-born Portuguese professional footballer who plays for Os Belenenses as a midfielder.

Club career
On 27 September 2017, Sambú made his professional debut with Braga B in a 2017–18 LigaPro match against Famalicão.

On 23 December 2022, Sambú signed with Os Belenenses.

References

External links

1998 births
Sportspeople from Bissau
Portuguese people of Bissau-Guinean descent
Bissau-Guinean emigrants to Portugal
Living people
Portuguese footballers
Portugal youth international footballers
Association football midfielders
S.C. Braga B players
C.D. Fátima players
S.C.U. Torreense players
C.F. Os Belenenses players
Campeonato de Portugal (league) players
Liga Portugal 2 players